Endotricha valentis is a species of snout moth in the genus Endotricha. It was described by Valentina A. Kirpichnikova in 2003, and is known from China (Yunnan) and the Russian Far East.

The ground colour of forewings is pink violet, with a dark pink violet basal area. The ground colour of the hindwings is pink violet, suffused with black scales.

References

Moths described in 2003
Moths of Asia
Endotrichini